WJUL (1230 AM) and 97.7 FM is a radio station broadcasting a Classic Hits format. Licensed to Hiawassee, Georgia, United States, the station is currently owned by WJUL Radio, LLC.

WJUL is the former callsign of what is now WUML, the student run radio outlet of the University of Massachusetts Lowell.

References

External links

JUL